Ceratophallus socotrensis is a species of freshwater air-breathing snails, aquatic pulmonate gastropod mollusks in the family Planorbidae, the ram's horn snails, or planorbids. The snails in this species have sinistral or left-coiling shells. This species is endemic to Socotra, Yemen.

References

Planorbidae
Endemic fauna of Socotra
Gastropods described in 1883
Taxonomy articles created by Polbot